Sousan Hajipour Goli (born 28 September 1990 in Babol) is an Iranian taekwondo practitioner. She competed in the 67 kg event at the 2012 Summer Olympics and was eliminated by Carmen Marton in the preliminary round.

References

External links
 

1990 births
Living people
Iranian female taekwondo practitioners
Olympic taekwondo practitioners of Iran
Taekwondo practitioners at the 2012 Summer Olympics
People from Babol
Asian Games bronze medalists for Iran
Asian Games medalists in taekwondo
Taekwondo practitioners at the 2010 Asian Games
Taekwondo practitioners at the 2014 Asian Games
Medalists at the 2010 Asian Games
Medalists at the 2014 Asian Games
Asian Taekwondo Championships medalists
Islamic Solidarity Games medalists in taekwondo
Islamic Solidarity Games competitors for Iran
Sportspeople from Mazandaran province
21st-century Iranian women